Juan Enrique Ibarra Pedroza (born August 16, 1952, in Tototlán, Jalisco) is a Mexican politician who in 2006 ran as the Party of the Democratic Revolution (PRD) candidate to the 2006 Jalisco gubernatorial election.

Ibarra holds a bachelor's degree in law from the Universidad de Guadalajara (UdeG).  He was an active member of the Institutional Revolutionary Party (PRI) in his native Jalisco; he served as local deputy in the Congress of Jalisco from 1983 to 1986 and from 1992 to 1995. He also served in the Chamber of Deputies of Mexico.

In November 2005 he resigned to the PRI because he wanted to run for governor since 1996 so he changed to the PRD and they make him the PRD candidate in Jalisco. He lost the election in third place against the PAN candidate.

See also
2006 Jalisco state election

References 

1952 births
Politicians from Jalisco
Living people
University of Guadalajara alumni
Members of the Chamber of Deputies (Mexico)
Mexican people of Basque descent
Institutional Revolutionary Party politicians
Party of the Democratic Revolution politicians
Members of the Congress of Jalisco
20th-century Mexican politicians
21st-century Mexican politicians
Deputies of the LIV Legislature of Mexico